Eva Marie Ditan (born 22 March 1978) is a Filipino taekwondo practitioner.

She competed at the 2000 Summer Olympics in Sydney.

References

External links

1978 births
Living people
Filipino female taekwondo practitioners
Olympic taekwondo practitioners of the Philippines
Taekwondo practitioners at the 2000 Summer Olympics
Taekwondo practitioners at the 2002 Asian Games
Asian Taekwondo Championships medalists
Asian Games competitors for the Philippines
21st-century Filipino women